Hypsilurus macrolepis, the Solomons tree dragon, is a species of agama found in the Solomon Islands.

References

Hypsilurus
Taxa named by Wilhelm Peters
Reptiles described in 1872
Reptiles of the Solomon Islands